Ono is an unincorporated community in Shasta County, California. Ono's center is on County Road A16, locally known as Platina Road, the village's only access to the rest of the world. Its population is 93 as of the 2020 census.

According to tradition, the community was named for the answer ("Oh, no") usually given by a miner to his son when asked if the latter could accompany his father to work. The name might instead be biblical in origin.

Ono is a community in slow decline, which began in the late 1970s when it lost its primary school and post office to is local neighbor, Igo.

In 2020, the Zogg Fire destroyed several buildings in Ono, including the Ono Store and Ono Grange.

Climate
According to the Köppen Climate Classification system, Ono has a warm-summer Mediterranean climate, abbreviated "Csa" on climate maps.

References

Unincorporated communities in California
Unincorporated communities in Shasta County, California